Terence Jeffers-Harris (born June 24, 1988) is a professional Canadian football wide receiver who is currently a free agent.

College career
He played college football at the University of Connecticut, and Vanderbilt University.

CFL career
He was signed by the Winnipeg Blue Bombers as a free agent on April 16, 2010. After he was released by the Bombers on November 17, 2011, he was quickly signed by the Tiger-Cats on November 18, 2011 to the team's practice roster. Jeffers-Harris was then signed by the Saskatchewan Roughriders on July 17, 2012. He signed with the Calgary Stampeders on February 5, 2013. He was released on June 16, 2013. On June 20, 2015, he was signed by the BC Lions, joining their practice roster.

References

External links
 Hamilton Tiger-Cats bio

1988 births
Living people
Canadian football wide receivers
Winnipeg Blue Bombers players
UConn Huskies football players
Vanderbilt Commodores football players
Hamilton Tiger-Cats players
Saskatchewan Roughriders players
Calgary Stampeders players
BC Lions players